Chief Bola Kuforiji-Olubi  (28 September 1936 – 3 December 2016)  was a Nigerian traditional aristocrat, accountant, banker and politician, she was minister of commerce and industry in 1993 during the Interim National Government of Chief Ernest Shonekan. In addition to a variety of other chieftaincy titles, she held that of the Otunba Ayora of Ijebu-Ode.

Life

Education and memberships
Kuforiji-Olubi Bola was born on  28 September 1936. Bola Kuforiji-Olubi graduated from the University of London in 1963 with B. Sc. honours in Economics. During her subsequent career, she became a fellow of the Institute of Charted Accountants, England and Wales in 1977, ICAN Nigeria in 1976, and the British chartered institute of company secretaries (ACIS) in 1964. She was also a member of both the Nigerian Institute of Management (FMIN) and the British Institute of Directors. she died on Saturday barely over two months after she clocked 80 years.

Honours
Kuforiji-Olubi was a recipient of the following honours and awards: 
 Doctor of Business administration from Enugu State University of Science and Technology, 1997 
 Doctor of Laws, LLD honoris causa (Latin: "for the sake of the honor").  Bayero University, Kano, 2004 
 Doctor of letters (Honoris Causa), Olabisi Onabanjo University, Ago Iwoye, Ogun State, 2006.
 The National award of member of the  Order of the Niger in 1979 for her contributions to management education and socio- economic advancement of Nigeria 
 The certificate of merit by the United Nations Decade for Women in 1980
 The award for excellence from the University of Benn's Skonit Club in 1988 
 The position of Honorary Grammarian of the CMS by the CMS grammar school in 1988
 The award of excellence by the Brigade of Nigeria in 1992
 The international award of excellence for outstanding entrepreneurial achievements, Massachusetts Institute of Technology, Cambridge, Massachusetts, United States.
 A recipient of the 2002 conferment award for a woman of achievement under the auspices of the Woman Development Centre, Abuja, 2005.

Positions held
Kuforiji-Olubi served in various capacities both locally and internationally. She was the 25th president of the Institute of Chartered Accountants of Nigeria; the first female to become president of the Institute, while she was in office she launched an Accounting Technicians Course.

She was the first Nigerian woman to become the CEO of a multinational company (VYB Industries Limited, with British affiliates (Inchcape plc) and the first female Chairperson of a public listed company (Bewac Plc).

Kufuriji-Olubi either chaired or otherwise served on the boards of many other companies. She was the  first Chairperson of the Osun River basin development (from 1976 to 1980) and a member of the governing council of the Nigerian Institute of Social and Economic research (NISER) (from 1981 to 1983). She was appointed chairman of a leading financial institution,  United Bank for Africa Plc in 1984, and served until 1990 as the first woman to hold that office in Africa south of the Sahara. She was also later v ice chair of the National conference on Nigerian foreign policy (until the year 2000), and a member of the National Sport commission (from 1986 to 1989). A foundation member and chair of the Lagos State Education endowment fund, she was appointed as the honorable secretary (or Minister) for commerce and tourism in the interim national government of Nigeria in 1983.
In addition to this, she was also a deputy chair and hon. federal commissioner for Ogun State at the revenue mobilization.

Publications
 The Female Entrepreneur and Financial Management for Survival (1987) 
 Civil service reform in a developing economy (1988) 
 The Corporate Woman: a marginalised group, problem and strategies for success, via public enlightenment programmes of the institute of directors (1989) 
 Technical education as a catalyst for technical cooperation and economic growth in developing countries (1992) 
 Changing Course'' - as a co-author.

References

External links
 https://web.archive.org/web/20130702135607/http://igclm.org/Board%20member2.html

1936 births
2016 deaths
Alumni of the University of London
Nigerian accountants
Nigerian bankers
Nigerian royalty
History of women in Nigeria
Officers of the Order of the Niger
Yoruba bankers
Yoruba women in business
Nigerian chairpersons of corporations
Nigerian women business executives
Women corporate directors
Women chief executives